Racing thoughts refers to the rapid thought patterns that often occur in manic, hypomanic, or mixed episodes. While racing thoughts are most commonly described in people with bipolar disorder and sleep apnea, they are also common with anxiety disorders, OCD, and other psychiatric disorders such as attention deficit hyperactivity disorder.  Racing thoughts are also associated with sleep deprivation, hyperthyroidism and the use of amphetamines.

Description
Racing thoughts may be experienced as background or take over a person's consciousness. Thoughts, music, and voices might be zooming through one's mind as they jump tangentially from one to the next. There also might be a repetitive pattern of voice or of pressure without any associated "sound". It is a very overwhelming and irritating feeling, and can result in losing track of time. In some cases, it may also be frightening to the person experiencing it, as there is a loss of control. If one is experiencing these thoughts at night when going to sleep, they may suddenly awaken, startled and confused by the very random and sudden nature of the thoughts. 

Racing thoughts differ in manifestation according to the individual's perspective. These manifestations can vary from unnoticed or minor distractions to debilitating stress, preventing the sufferer from maintaining a thought.

Generally, racing thoughts are described by an individual who has had an episode where the mind uncontrollably brings up random thoughts and memories and switches between them very quickly. Sometimes they are related, as one thought leads to another; other times they seem completely random. A person suffering from an episode of racing thoughts has no control over their train of thought, and it stops them from focusing on one topic or prevents sleeping.

Associated conditions
The causes of racing thoughts are most often associated with anxiety disorders, but many influences can cause these rapid, racing thoughts. There are also many associated conditions, in addition to anxiety disorders, which can be classified as having secondary relationships with causing racing thoughts. The conditions most commonly linked to racing thoughts are bipolar disorder, anxiety disorder, attention deficit hyperactivity disorder, sleep deprivation, amphetamine dependence, and hyperthyroidism.

Anxiety disorders
Racing thoughts associated with anxiety disorders can be caused by many different conditions, such as obsessive–compulsive disorder (OCD), panic disorder, generalized anxiety disorder, or posttraumatic stress disorder. 

In people with OCD, racing thoughts can be brought on by stressors, or triggers, causing disturbing thoughts in the individual. These disturbing thoughts, then, result in compulsions characterizing OCD in order to lower the stress and gain some sort of control over these stressful, racing thoughts.

Panic disorder is an anxiety disorder characterized by repeated panic attacks of fear or nervousness, lasting several minutes. During these panic attacks, the response is out of proportion to the situation.  The racing thoughts may feel catastrophic and intense, but they are a symptom of the panic attack and must be controlled in order to soothe the panic and minimize the panic attack.

Generalized anxiety disorder is a neurological anxiety disorder that involves uncontrollable and excessive worrying about irrational topics or problems. These stressful thoughts must be present for at least six months in order to be diagnosed as GAD. Along with other symptoms, racing thoughts is one of the most common ones. With GAD, there is an inability to relax or let thoughts or worries go, persistent worrying and obsessions about small concerns that are out of proportion to the result, and even worrying about their excessive worrying.

Bipolar disorder
Racing thoughts can be brought on by bipolar disorder, defined by mood instability that range from extreme emotional highs, mania, to severe depression. During the manic phase of bipolar disorder is when racing thoughts usually occur. Disjointed, constantly changing thoughts with no underlying theme can be a sign of the manic phase of bipolar disorder. Manic thoughts can prevent performance of daily routines due to their rapid, unfocused and overwhelming nature. Racing thoughts in people with bipolar disorder are generally accompanied with other symptoms associated with this disorder.

Amphetamines
Amphetamines are used as a stimulant to trigger the central nervous system, increasing heart rate and blood pressure while decreasing appetite. Since amphetamines are a stimulant, use of these drugs result in a state that resembles the manic phase of bipolar disorder and also produces similar symptoms, as stated above.

Attention deficit hyperactivity disorder
Racing thoughts associated with ADHD is most common in adults. With ADHD, racing thoughts can occur and tend to cause insomnia. Racing thoughts in people with ADHD tend to be rapid, unstable thoughts which do not follow any sort of pattern, similar to racing thoughts in people with bipolar disorder. Medications used to treat ADHD, such as Adderall or Methylphenidate, can be prescribed to patients with ADHD to calm these racing thoughts,  most commonly in the morning when people wake up but just as well in the evening before sleep.

Lack of sleep
Racing thoughts, also referred to as "racing mind", may prevent a person from falling asleep. Chronic sleep apnea and prolonged disturbed sleep patterns may also induce racing thoughts. Treatment for sleep apnea and obstructive airway disorder can improve airflow and improve sleep resulting in improved brain and REM function and reduced racing thought patterns.

Hyperthyroidism
Hyperthyroidism is a condition in which the thyroid gland produces too much thyroid hormone, thyroxin. This overabundance of thyroxin causes irregular and rapid heartbeat, irritability, weight loss, nervousness, anxiety and racing thoughts.
The anxiety and inability to focus is very common in hyperthyroidism and leads to racing thoughts, as well as panic attacks and difficulty concentrating.

Frequency
Anxiety disorder, the most common mental illness in the United States, affects 40 million people, ages 10 and older; this accounts for 18% of the U.S. population. Most people suffering from anxiety disorder report some form of racing thoughts symptom

The prevalence of OCD in every culture studied is at least 2% of the population, and the majority of those have obsessions, or racing thoughts. With these reportings, estimates of more than 2 million people in the United States (as of 2000) suffer from racing thoughts.

Treatment
There are various treatments available to calm racing thoughts, some of which involve medication. One type of treatment involves writing out the thoughts onto paper. Some treatments suggest using activities, such as painting, cooking, and other hobbies, to keep the mind busy and distract from the racing thoughts. Exercise may be used to tire the person, thereby calming their mind. When racing thoughts are anxiety induced during panic or anxiety attacks, it is recommended that the person wait it out. Using breathing and meditation techniques to calm the breath and mind simultaneously is another tool for handling racing thoughts induced by anxiety attacks. Mindfulness meditation has also shown to help with racing thoughts by allowing practitioners to face their thoughts head-on, without reacting.

While all of these techniques can be useful to cope with racing thoughts, it may prove necessary to seek medical attention and counsel. Since racing thoughts are associated with many other underlying mental illnesses, such as bipolar disorder, anxiety disorder, and ADHD, medications used commonly to treat these disorders will help calm racing thoughts in patients.

Treatment for the underlying causes of racing thoughts is helpful and useful in order to calm the racing thoughts more permanently. For example, in people with ADHD, medications used to promote focus and calm distracting thoughts, will help them with their ADHD. 

Some obstructive airway disorders may be relieved with nasal septoplasty which can improve sleep and lead to a reduction of racing mind.
Insomnia may increase racing thoughts and those effected will find sleep apnea treatment and nasal surgery helpful to eliminate their racing thoughts. 

It is important to look at the underlying defect that may be causing racing thoughts in order to prevent them in the long-term.

See also
 Flight of ideas
 Intrusive thoughts
 Pressure of speech
 Sleep apnea
 Tachypsychia
 Impulse control disorder
 Mixed affective state
 Mood swing

References

Bipolar disorder
Symptoms and signs of mental disorders

es:Fuga de ideas
pt:Fuga de ideias
ru:Скачка идей
ur:پروازِ افکار